Vaughan Glacier is a tributary glacier, 10 nautical miles (18 km) long, draining eastward from Mount Vaughan to enter Scott Glacier just south of Taylor Ridge, in the Hays Mountains of the Queen Maud Mountains. It was mapped by the United States Geological Survey (USGS) from surveys and U.S. Navy air photos, 1960–64, and was named by the Advisory Committee on Antarctic Names (US-ACAN) in association with Mount Vaughan.

The glacier is located north of Citadel Peak.

References 

 

Glaciers of Amundsen Coast